The Håkan Loob Trophy is the annual award for the Swedish Hockey League (SHL) player who scores the most goals during the regular season. It was created by Svenska Hockeyligan and Canal+ in honour of Håkan Loob, who holds the SHL record for most goals in a season (42 goals). It was first handed out for the 2005–06 season, on Elitserien's 30 year anniversary.

The winner's team is awarded 1,000 Swedish kronor per goal scored by the player, which goes to the club's youth programme.

Winners

References 

Awards established in 1976
Swedish ice hockey trophies and awards
Swedish Hockey League